HipTV is a Nigerian basic cable television channel owned by Ayo Animashaun. The channel is the sole channel with broadcasting rights to The Headies. Headquartered in Ikeja, Lagos State, HipTV's features are centred majorly on entertainment ranging from latest music videos, entertainment news and lifestyle.

History
HipTV was launched in July 2007 by Ayo Animashaun as a broadcast platform for Hip Hop World Magazine but has since risen to become a music and entertainment channel.

On November 5, 2013, HipTV was launched on Multichoice's DSTV as a 24-hour channel with a target audience from over 40 countries in Africa.

References

External links

2007 establishments in Nigeria
Television channels and stations established in 2007
Television stations in Nigeria
Television stations in Lagos
Companies based in Lagos